Never Before may refer to:
 "Never Before" (song), a song by Deep Purple
 Never Before (The Byrds album)
 Never Before (Cold Chisel album)